The 1991 Tooheys 1000 was a motor race which was staged at the Mount Panorama Circuit just outside Bathurst in New South Wales, Australia on 6 October 1991. It was the 32nd running of the Bathurst 1000. The 1000 km race was held for cars complying with the provisions of Australian Group 3A Touring Car regulations with the field divided into three engine capacity divisions. It was the Round 2 of both the 1991 Australian Endurance Championship and the 1991 Australian Manufacturers' Championship.

Nissan driver Mark Skaife became the first driver since Peter Brock in 1983 to claim provisional pole position, pole position after the Top 10 runoff (with a then fastest touring car lap time of 2:12.63), the race win, and the fastest race lap. His lap record in the race was set in the teams #2 GT-R and not the #1 he drove to victory with Jim Richards. (Brock's race record lap of 1983 was also set in the team's second, #25 car, but that was the car he drove to victory with John Harvey and Larry Perkins).

The Richards / Skaife Nissan GT-R recorded a one lap victory from the Holden Racing Team entered Holden VN Commodore SS Group A SV of 1990 race winners Win Percy and Allan Grice with the GIO Racing Nissan GT-R of Mark Gibbs and dual Australian Drivers' Champion Rohan Onslow a further lap behind in third place. After having won the Sandown 500 in the lead up to Bathurst, third place was enough to see Gibbs and Onslow win the Australian Endurance Championship and help win Nissan their fourth Australian Manufacturers' Championship.

With the overall race time of 6h 19m 14.80s breaking the 1984 record of 6h 23m 13.06s. The 1991 time remained as the race record for the 1000 km event until it was broken at the 2010 event with a 6h 12m 51.4153s race time. As of the end of 2018 the 1991 edition is still one of the fastest races in the history of this event, being the sixth fastest.

Divisional  structure

Division 1
For Group 3A cars of 3001cc and Over engine capacity, it featured the turbocharged Nissan Skylines, Ford Sierras, Toyota Supras and a Mitsubishi Starion, the V8 Holden Commodores and a BMW 635 CSi.

Division 2
For Group 3A cars of 1601-3000cc engine capacity, it was composed exclusively of BMW M3s, both the 2.5 L "Evo" version and the original 2.3 L car.

Division 3
For Group 3A cars of Up to 1600cc engine capacity, it was composed exclusively of various models of Toyota Corolla.

Tooheys Top 10

* After breaking Tony Longhurst's 1990 qualifying record of 2:13.84 by a full second, Mark Skaife lowered the mark again with a 2:12.630 in the Top 10. Skaife's Nissan GT-R also recorded a Group A fastest ever  on Conrod Straight during the runoff.* 1991 was the first ever all-Nissan front row at Bathurst. It was also Nissan's third Bathurst pole position after George Fury claimed pole in 1984 in the Bluebird turbo, and Gary Scott had done so in 1986 in the Skyline DR30 RS turbo. With three GT-R's, Nissan also had its best ever representation in the runoff, breaking the record of two set in 1982 and 1986.* 1991 was the only time between 1988 and 1992 that a Ford Sierra RS500 did not qualify on the pole. Glenn Seton in the fastest Sierra was over 2 seconds slower than Skaife and one second slower than the GT-R of second placed Mark Gibbs. His time was also 0.952 slower than Klaus Niedzwiedz's 1990 pole time in a Sierra.* Peter Brock made his first appearance driving a Holden in the runoff since the first Group A race in 1985. Brock qualified his Holden VN Commodore SS Group A SV in 6th place. Compared to Skaife's speed on Conrod Straight in the twin-turbo GT-R, Brock's naturally aspirated V8 Commodore recorded , though this was a substantial improvement as the older model Holden VL Commodore SS Group A SV usually topped out at around  unless aided by a tow from another car. Despite this the VN Commodores were in fact almost 1.5 seconds slower than the VL model had been in 1990.* 1991 was the only time between his pole positions in 1988 and 1992 that Dick Johnson did not qualify his #17 Sierra on the front row.* Drew Price (Nissan), Larry Perkins (Commodore), David Parsons (Sierra), and Win Percy (Commodore) were the only drivers not to improve on their qualifying time.* HRT team manager and defending race winner Win Percy, who was competing in his 6th Bathurst 1000, made his first appearance in the Top 10 runoff. In four of his previous five races his cars had in fact competed in the runoff but it was his co-drivers - Tom Walkinshaw in 1985 and Allan Grice in 1987, 1988 and 1990, who did the driving on those occasions (Percy did not drive in 1986 and only qualified 18th in 1989).

Official results

Statistics
 Provisional Pole Position - #1 Mark Skaife - 2:12.84
 Pole Position – #1 Mark Skaife – 2:12.63
 Fastest Lap – #2 Mark Skaife – 2:14.50 - Lap 130 (new lap record)
 Average Speed – 158 km/h
 Race Time - 6:19:14.80 (new race record)

See also
1991 Australian Touring Car season

References

External links
 Australian titles Retrieved from CAMS Online Manual of Motor Sport on 28 September 1991
 www.touringcarracing.net
 race results
 1991 Tooheys 1000 images Retrieved from Autopics on 28 September 1991

Motorsport in Bathurst, New South Wales
Tooheys 1000